June Thomson (also known as June Valerie Thomson), (born ) is an English detective novelist.

Biography
A former teacher, Thomson was educated at Chelmsford High School and Bedford College University of London. She is the creator of the Chief Inspector Jack Finch (Inspector Rudd in American editions) and Sergeant Tom Boyce series of novels. Since 1990 she has also written a series of Sherlock Holmes pastiche collections of short stories. Her works have been translated into many languages. June Thomson previously lived in St. Albans in Hertfordshire and now lives in Rugby. She is the mother of the philosophy writer Garrett Thomson. Her younger son is Paul Thomson.

Bibliography

Chief Inspector Jack Finch/Inspector Rudd
Not One of Us (1971)
Death Cap (1973)
The Long Revenge (1974)
Case Closed (1977)
A Question of Identity (1977)
Deadly Relations (aka The Habit of Loving) (1979)
Alibi in Time (1980)
Shadow of a Doubt (1981)
To Make a Killing (aka Portrait of Lilith) (1982)
Sound Evidence (1984)
A Dying Fall (1985)
The Dark Stream (1986)
No Flowers by Request (1987)
Rosemary for Remembrance (1988)
The Spoils of Time (1989)
Past Reckoning (1990)
Foul Play (1991)
Burden of Innocence (1996)
The Unquiet Grave (2000)
Going Home (2006)

Sherlock Holmes

The Secret Files of Sherlock Holmes (1990)
The Case of the Vanishing Head-Waiter
The Case of the Amateur Mendicants
The Case of the Remarkable Worm
The Case of the Exalted Client
The Case of the Notorious Canary Trainer
The Case of the Itinerant Yeggman
The Case of the Abandoned Lighthouse
The Secret Chronicles of Sherlock Holmes (1992)
The Case of the Paradol Chamber
The Case of the Hammersmith Wonder
 The Case of the Maplestead Magpie
The Case of the Harley Street Specialist
The Case of the Old Russian Woman
The Case of the Camberwell Poisoning
The Case of the Sumatran Rat
The Secret Journals of Sherlock Holmes (1993)
The Case of the Millionaire's Persecution
 The Case of the Colonel's Madness
 The Case of the Addleton Tragedy
The Case of the Shopkeeper's Terror
 The Case of the Friesland Outrage
 The Case of the Smith-Mortimer Succession
The Case of the Maupertuis Scandal
Holmes and Watson: A Study in Friendship (1995)
The Secret Documents of Sherlock Holmes (1999)
The Case of the Ainsworth Abduction
 The Case of the Boulevard Assassin
 The Case of the Wimbledon Tragedy
 The Case of the Ferrers Documents
 The Case of the Vatican Cameos
 The Case of the Camberwell Deception
 The Case of the Barton Wood Murder
The Secret Notebooks of Sherlock Holmes (2004)
The Case of the Upwood Scandal
 The Case of the Aluminium Crutch
 The Case of the Manor House Mystery
 The Case of the Cardinal's Corpse
 The Case of the Arnsworth Affair
 The Case of the Vanishing Barque
 The Case of the Gustaffson Stonel
The Secret Archives of Sherlock Holmes (2012)
  The Case of the Conk-Singleton Forgery 
 The Case of the Stray Chicken
 The Case of the Oneeyed Colonel
 The Case of the Threehanded Widow
 The Case of the Pentre Mawr Murder
 The Case of the Missing Belle Fille
 The Case of the Watchful Waiter
Sherlock Homes and the Lady in Black (2015)

References 

 Biography : Editor's foreword in "Les Dossiers Secrets de Sherlock Holmes" ("The secret journals of Sherlock Holmes") Le Masque  Les Reines du Crime Librairie des Champs Elysées 1995

External links 
 Bibliography at Fantastic Fiction

1930 births
Living people
People from the City of Chelmsford
English crime fiction writers
English women novelists
Sherlock Holmes
20th-century English women writers
20th-century English writers
Women crime writers